The Nizam's Rubath is an accommodation building for pilgrims coming to the Mecca. It was purchased by the Nizam for the people of Hyderabad State. In 2017, a total of 3,400 pilgrims were selected for free accommodation.

Located about 2 km from the Grand Mosque of Mecca, the Rubaath now comes under the "AWQAF (Endowment) Committee" of The H.E.H. the Nizam's Charitable Trust.

History
Originally there were 42 Rubath buildings purchased in 1860 by V th Nizam, Afzal ad-Dawlah, Asaf Jah V for the people of Hyderabad State, but only a couple are left after the expansion of the grand mosque of Mecca.

With the massive expansion of Makkah's Grand Mosque, the 140-year-old Rubath today comprises only three buildings, containing 500 rooms that can accommodate a minimum of about 1200 people. The people who use the facilities of Rubaths do not have to pay any fee.

Pilgrims from the erstwhile Nizam's dominion (Hyderabad State) were accepted here. This would translate to today's Telangana, Marathwada and Hyderabad Karnataka regions who can apply for the Rubath accommodation. Since there is a great demand for accommodation during the Hajj season, the pilgrims are selected through a draw of applicants.

It is located in Ibrahim Al Khaleel Street, Al Misfalah in Mecca. It has capacity for nearly 500 people.

See also
 Nizams of Hyderabad

References

External links
Official site

Hyderabad State
Islam in India